Édgar Núñez may refer to:

Édgar Núñez (politician), Peruvian politician
Édgar Núñez (footballer) (born 1979), Honduran footballer